Sergey Mikhaylovich Ignatyev (born January 10, 1948 in Leningrad, Soviet Union) is a Russian economist, banker, and official. Since 2013 to 2022 - Advisor to the Chairman of the Central Bank of the Russian Federation. Since 2002 to 2013 - Chairman of the Central Bank of the Russian Federation. Since 1997 to 2002 - First Deputy Minister of Finance of the Russian Federation, from 1993 to 1996 - Deputy Minister of Economy of the Russian Federation. Since 1992 to 1993 - Deputy Chairman of the Central Bank of Russia, from 1991 to 1992 - Deputy Minister of Economy and Finance of the Russian Federation.

First Deputy Finance Minister of Russia
From September 13, 1996, to April 5, 1997, he was an aide to President Boris Yeltsin for economy. From April 1997 – March 2002, he worked as a First Deputy Finance Minister of Russia.

Chairman of Central Bank of Russia
From March 20, 2002, to June 24, 2013 he was the Chairman of the Central Bank of the Russian Federation and was replaced by Elvira Nabiullina.

His deputy in charge of bank supervision, Andrei Kozlov was shot dead on 14 September 2006 after he revealed an enormous illegal money laundering scheme.

Kozlov was replaced by Gennady Melikyan as deputy governor of the central bank in charge of bank supervision but resigned in September 2011.

2012 illegal money laundering in Russia
On 20 February 2013, Ignatyev stated that $49 billion associated with illegal one day networks of shell companies, which were controlled by one group of people, with capital outflows from Russia, which were equivalent to 2.5% of Russia's gross domestic product (GDP), had occurred during 2012.

Sberbank
In February 2022, Sergey Ignatyev left the supervisory board of Sberbank.

References

External links
 http://cbr.ru/eng/today/directors_board/print.asp?file=ignatiev.htm - S. Ignatiev's Biography

1948 births
Living people
1st class Active State Councillors of the Russian Federation
Presidents of the Central Bank of Russia
Russian bankers
Russian politicians